This is a timeline of events during the War in Iraq in 2016.

Chronology

January 
 Attacks in Baghdad and Miqdadiyah

February 
 February 2 – The beginning of the Siege of Fallujah (2016).
 February 19 – Preparations for the Hīt offensive (2016).

March 
 March 6 – 2016 Hillah suicide truck bombing: A suicide bomber kills at least 60 people and wounds 70 others after ramming his explosives-laden truck into a security checkpoint at one of entrances to the Iraqi city of Hillah, south of Baghdad. The Islamic State of Iraq and the Levant claimed responsibility for the bombing.
 March 24 – Iraqi forces launch an offensive to recapture the Al-Shirqat District from ISIL
 March 25 – Iskandariya suicide bombing: A suicide bomber blew himself up in a crowd  after a local football game in a village near Iskandariya, in a mixed Sunni-Shiite area, killing at least 30 people and wounding more than 65. The mayor of the town was among those killed in the explosion, he succumbed to his wounds in a hospital. The Islamic State of Iraq and the Levant claimed responsibility for the bombing.
 March 27 – Iraqi Yazidis and tribal fighters (part of Iraq's military) take control of an area between Sinjar and the border of Syria from ISIL. This is along the main highway (and key ISIL supply line) between Mosul, Iraq and Shadadi (or Ash Shaddadi), Syria, which a predominantly Syrian Kurd force captured from ISIL last month. An alternative connection, that also requires this highway, would be to Al Hasakah, Syria, slightly north.
 March 29 – A suicide bomb attack kills at least seven people and wounds another 23 in Baghdad. A police officer says the suicide bomber set off his payload among a group of day laborers in Baghdad's Tayaran Square. The Islamic State of Iraq and the Levant claimed responsibility for the attack in an online statement circulated by supporters, saying it targeted Shiite militiamen.

April 
 April 2 – Iraqi security forces free a large number of prisoners from an underground ISIL-operated jail in the city of Hīt. Malallah al-Obeidi, a local official in the Al Anbar Governorate, put the number of freed prisoners at around 1,500, saying most of them were civilians.

May 
 May 1 – 2016 Samawa bombing: In a rare attack in Iraq's mostly Shiite south, a twin suicide bombing kills at least 33 people and wounds 75 in the city of Samawah, Muthanna Governorate. The Islamic State of Iraq and the Levant claimed responsibility.
 May 13 – Real Madrid Fan Club massacre: A group of ISIL militants attack the headquarters of a supporters club of the Spanish football club Real Madrid C.F. in Balad District, north of Baghdad. At least 16 people were killed in the attack.
 May 18 – Iraq's Prime Minister, Haider al-Abadi, announced that the Iraqi army and PMF liberated the town of Rutbah, in the Anbar province, after a four-day-long battle with ISIS. The liberation of Rutbah has been viewed as strategically important, as it lies 150 km east of the Al Waleed border crossing with Syria, and 250 km south of Al-Qa'im.
 May 22 – Beginning of Third Battle of Fallujah.

June 
27 June – The Iraqi army enters the outskirts of Fallujah in the last phase of the Battle of Fallujah
29 June – The Iraqi air force heavily bombs ISIS vehicles retreating from Fallujah

July

August 
21 August – An Iraqi F16 fighter bombed Mosul. The attack left 10 Islamic State fighters dead.
21 August – At least 30 fighters from Islamic State were killed by security forces in Ramadi.
25 August – Qayyarah is liberated from ISIS to allow for a future offensive on Mosul.
27 August – An airstrike killed 12 Islamic State insurgents in Sadia village.
28 August – One Islamic State leader dies in an airstrike in Mosul.
28 August – Clashes left 2 ISIS terrorists dead in Hawija.
29 August – 5 ISIS fighters die in an airstrike in Anbar province.
30 August – An airstrike left 4 Islamic State terrorists dead.

September 
3 September – At least 18 terrorists from Islamic State die in an airstrike in Anbar province.
4 September – Kurdish fighters killed at least 7 Islamic State insurgents in Tal Afar.
4 September – Security forces killed at least 2 Islamic State insurgents.
5 September – The Islamic State of Iraq and the Levant bans burqas in northern Iraq after a series of fatal attacks on its members by veiled women.
22 September – the Iraqi Army recaptures Al-Shirqat entirely along with several other villages.

October 
4 October – Iraqi Air Forces bombing killed at least 40 insurgents from Islamic State. The airstrike occurred near Anbar.
5 October – United States bombing Islamic State target killing 10. The airstrike occurred near Mosul.
6 October – 4 terrorists from Islamic State were shoot dead in Qaim.
8 October – Airstrike left 7 terrorist from Islamic State dead. The airstrike occurred near Ramadi.
11 October – 8 insurgents from Islamic State die in airstrike. The incident occurred in Mosul.
15 October – A bombing by coalition left 5 Islamic State insurgents dead and 7 were wounded in Nineveh.
16 October – Iraqi forces launch an offensive to recapture the city of Mosul from ISIL.
19 October – 21 Islamic State insurgents were killed by security forces in Bojwana village.
20 October – A leader from Islamic State die in airstrike. The airstrike occurred in Tel al-Sheer village, Nineveh.
21 October – Beginning of the Battle of Kirkuk (2016).
24 October – At least 15 insurgents from Islamic State die in clashes with Peshmerga forces. The clash occurred in Sinjar. Peshmerga forces also announce that they’ve ousted the Islamic State from the city of Kirkuk. 
25 October – In Rutba district 40 insurgents from Islamic State die.

See also 

 2016 in Iraq
 Terrorist incidents in Iraq in 2016
 Timeline of ISIL-related events (2016)

References

External links 
 Iraqi News

Iraq War
Iraq War
Iraq War
Timelines of the War in Iraq (2013–2017)
Lists of armed conflicts in 2016